Alexander C. Fällström (born September 15, 1990) is a Swedish former professional ice hockey Forward. He last played under contract with Djurgårdens IF in the Swedish Hockey League (SHL). Fällström was selected by the Minnesota Wild in the 4th round (116th overall) of the 2009 NHL Entry Draft.

Playing career
Fällström played junior hockey in Djurgården before moving to the United States to play for Harvard University in the NCAA. During his freshman year, he lived in Canaday Hall. Fällström's tenure with the Wild was brief as his rights were traded along with Craig Weller, and a second round pick in 2011 to the Boston Bruins in exchange for Chuck Kobasew on October 18, 2009. He was later signed to a two-year entry-level contract with the Boston Bruins on March 17, 2013.

Fällström played parts of three seasons for Boston's affiliate, the Providence Bruins in the American Hockey League.

In the final year of his entry-level contract, Fällström returned to Sweden during the 2014–15 season in signing a multi-year contract with original club, Djurgårdens IF. Fällström's second tenure with the club was blighted due to a concussion, limiting him to play in just 26 games over two seasons. Fällström was cleared to resume playing and was signed to a one-year extension with DIF on April 14, 2016.

In the lead up to the 2016–17 season, Fällström having recovered from his concussion symptoms was initially ruled out for the opening weeks due to a back injury. It was later announced, after specialist appointments, that Fällström's back injury was career threatening and he was ruled out for entirety of the season on October 2, 2016.

Career statistics

References

External links

1990 births
Living people
Djurgårdens IF Hockey players
Harvard Crimson men's ice hockey players
Minnesota Wild draft picks
Providence Bruins players
Swedish ice hockey right wingers
Ice hockey people from Gothenburg